Oumie Jammeh is a Swedish fashion model of Gambian heritage.

Career 
Jammeh started her career by submitting photos to modeling agencies, and she was signed by Next Management, and modeled during Stockholm Fashion Week in 2016. She considers British supermodel Naomi Campbell to be her biggest career inspiration.

Jammeh walked the runway for Prada, Louis Vuitton, Versace, Givenchy, Miu Miu, Altuzarra, Loewe, and Valentino. She has appeared in advertisements for J Brand, Mango, Miu Miu, and Valentino.

She has appeared in editorials for Elle, British Vogue, Vogue Italia, Elle Sweden, Vogue, Vogue France, and W.

References 

Living people
Swedish people of Gambian descent
People from Stockholm
Swedish female models
Next Management models
Gambian women
Year of birth missing (living people)